Hoslovice is a municipality and village in Strakonice District in the South Bohemian Region of the Czech Republic. It has about 200 inhabitants.

Administrative parts
Villages of Hodějov and Škrobočov are administrative parts of Hoslovice.

References

Villages in Strakonice District